Rusio is a commune in the Haute-Corse department of France on the island of Corsica.

Geography

Climate

Rusio has a hot-summer Mediterranean climate (Köppen climate classification Csa).

Population

See also
Communes of the Haute-Corse department

References

Communes of Haute-Corse